621 may refer to:
The year
621 A.D.
621 B.C.
The number 621
Experiment 621, also known as "Chopsuey", from Disney's Stitch: Experiment 626 video game
Flavour Enhancer 621 - Monosodium glutamate

Events
621 births
621 deaths